Isaac Beverly Lake Jr. (January 30, 1934 – September 12, 2019) was an American jurist and politician, who served as chief justice of the North Carolina Supreme Court.

Early life
I. Beverly Lake Jr. was born on January 30, 1934, in Raleigh, North Carolina, United States to I. Beverly Lake Sr. and Gertrude Bell. He attended Wake Forest Grammar and High School from 1940 to 1951. He earned the rank of Eagle Scout in 1949. He received the Distinguished Eagle Scout Award in 2006. Lake also served briefly in the United States Army from 1956 to 1958. He got a Bachelor of Science degree from Wake Forest University in 1955, and secured a Juris Doctor from Wake Forest University School of Law in 1960.

Political career

Early activities 
In the late 1960s, Lake entered politics. Between 1969 and 1976, Lake served as an appointed deputy attorney general for the state of North Carolina. He served two terms in the North Carolina Senate as a Democrat. A conservative, in his last session in the legislature he convinced the body to remove segregation academies from state oversight.

1980 gubernatorial election 
In October 1979 Lake announced his intention to seek the Republican nomination in the upcoming 1980 North Carolina gubernatorial election. A few days later he officially switched his partisan registration from the Democratic Party to the Republican Party. He ran as the unsuccessful nominee against incumbent Governor Jim Hunt. While not campaigning on segregation, he refused to eschew his father's politics, saying that he was "proud of his public record".

Judicial career 
From 1985 to 1986 Lake served as Governor James G. Martin's legislative liaison. Lake ran for the North Carolina Supreme Court in 1990 but lost to incumbent John Webb, who he had attacked as being "soft on crime". In 1992 Martin appointed Lake to the Supreme Court. He ran for election later that year but lost to Sarah Parker. In 1994 Lake re-contested the seat and defeated Parker with 55 percent of the vote. Along with Richard Orr, he became one of the first two Republicans elected to the bench.

He was elected as the court's chief justice in 2000, defeating incumbent Henry Frye. The two maintained cordial relations and occasionally golfed together. In April 2002 the court ruled that legislative districts drawn by Democratic legislative leaders violated North Carolina's constitution for not respecting county boundaries. Lake authored the majority opinion, writing that "Enforcement of the [whole counties provision] will, in all likelihood, foster improved voter morale, voter turnout, and public respect for state government, and specifically, the General Assembly, as an institution."

While serving as chief justice, a series of high-profile wrongful convictions in North Carolina came to his attention. He reviewed several of the cases with his clerk and resolved that the criminal justice system required reform. In 2002, he convened a commission including defense attorneys, prosecutors, law enforcement officers to review how innocent people were convicted and how to exonerate them. The body released a study which led to the creation of a new government agency, the N.C. Innocence Inquiry Commission, in 2006. It was designed to review convictions and release persons found innocent. By North Carolina law, he had to step down in 2006, after his 72nd birthday. He was succeeded by then-Associate Justice Sarah Parker.

Later life 
Lake died on September 12, 2019, at the retirement home where he lived following a rapid decline in his health.

References

Works cited 
 
 
 
 

1934 births
2019 deaths
Chief Justices of the North Carolina Supreme Court
North Carolina state senators
Wake Forest University School of Law alumni
North Carolina Democrats
North Carolina Republicans
Politicians from Raleigh, North Carolina
People from Wake Forest, North Carolina
Military personnel from North Carolina